The Puntland Dervish Force ( )  is the official paramilitary division of the Puntland Security Force.

History
Following the outbreak of the civil war in 1991, a homegrown constitutional conference was held in Garowe in 1998 over a period of three months. Attended by the area's political elite, traditional elders (Issims), members of the business community, intellectuals and other civil society representatives, the autonomous Puntland State of Somalia was subsequently officially established so as to deliver services to the population, offer security, facilitate trade, and interact with both domestic and international partners. The Puntland Security Force (PSF) was subsequently formed by the regional government.

Since the founding of the state in 1998, the Puntland Dervish Force has operated in Puntland and throughout Somalia. Commanders and senior officials of the military are appointed by a qualified panel approved by the Council of Ministers.

The Puntland security apparatus has an independent military judiciary, which during peacetime only adjudges military proceedings. Retired members of the Force are also constitutionally guaranteed pensions.

Equipment
 Individual Weapons
 Assault Rifle
AKM (Assault Rifle - 7.62×39mm)
AK-74 (Assault Rifle - 5.45×39mm)
PK machine gun (General-purpose machine gun - 7.62×54mmR)
 Sniper Rifle
SVD Dragunov (Sniper Rifle - 7.62×54mmR)
 Anti-Tank Explosive
RPG-7 (rocket-propelled grenade launcher - 40 mm)
 Vehicles
 Main Battle Tank
T-54/T-55
 Armoured Personnel Carrier
BTR-60
Fiat 6614
 Military trucks
Renault GBC 180 (6×6)
M939 Truck (6×6)
 Pickup trucks
Toyota Land Cruiser J79
Toyota Hilux
Nissan Frontier
Armored Ford F350 Gun Truck
 Artillery and heavy machine guns
 Heavy machine guns
 12.7mm DShK
 12.7mm NSV
 Self-Propelled Artillery
 122mm BM-21 Grad Multiple Rocket Launcher
 Mortar
 60mm M-224
 Anti-Aircraft Gun
 ZU-23-2

See also
Puntland Maritime Police Force
Puntland Intelligence Agency
Military of Somalia
Somali Salvation Democratic Front

References

Organisations based in Puntland
Military of Somalia
Law enforcement in Somalia